Campers Island may refer to:

Campers Island (Minnesota)
Campers Island (New Mexico)